"Sex Drive" is a 1993 single by Grace Jones.

Background
"Sex Drive" is a cover version of the Sheep on Drugs 1992 song "Track X". It was written by band members themselves and produced for Grace by Mark Pistel and Philip Steir. It was released on 23 September 1993 by Island Records with a cover of the Consolidated song "Typical Male" as the B-side. The single met with considerable success, topping the US dance chart.

Both songs were to be featured on Jones' then-forthcoming Black Marilyn album, planned for a 1994 release, but eventually shelved due to an unknown reason. Two remixes of "Sex Drive" were later included in a 1996 compilation Island Life 2, a France-only re-release of Island Life, as well as an edited version of the song on the 2006 compilation The Grace Jones Story.

Track listings
CD single (Germany)
 "Sex Drive" (Hard Drive Mix) – 5:08
 "Sex Drive" (Sex Pitch Mix) – 7:17
 "Sex Drive" (Dominatrix Mix) – 5:36

CD single (US)
 "Sex Drive" (Hard Drive Mix) – 5:08
 "Sex Drive" (Sex Pitch Mix) – 7:17
 "Sex Drive" (Dominatrix Mix) – 5:36
 "Typical Male" (The Real Mix) – 5:48

12" single
A1. "Sex Drive" (Hard Drive Mix) – 5:08
A2. "Sex Drive" (Sex Pitch Mix) – 7:17
B1. "Sex Drive" (Dominatrix Mix) – 5:36
B2. "Typical Male" (The Real Mix) – 5:48

12" promotional single
A1. "Sex Drive" (Sex Pitch Mix) – 7:17
A2. "Sex Drive" (Sexstrumental) – 6:36
B. "Sex Drive" (Hard Drive Mix) – 5:08

Chart performance

References

1993 singles
Grace Jones songs
House music songs
1992 songs
Island Records singles
Techno songs